Averbakh is a surname of Russian origin. People with that name include:

 Ilya Averbakh (1934-1986), Soviet film director
 Leopold Averbakh (1903-1937), Soviet communist literary critic
 Mikhail Averbakh (1872-1944), Russian and Soviet ophthalmologist
 Yuri Averbakh (1922–2022), Soviet and Russian chess player and author

See also
 

Surnames of Russian origin